Panther Creek is a tributary of Spring Brook in Lackawanna County, Pennsylvania, in the United States. It has one  named tributary, which is known as Painter Creek. Panther Creek is considered to be Class A Wild Trout Waters. The surficial geology in its vicinity consists of alluvium, alluvial terrace, Wisconsinan Till, and bedrock.

Course
Panther Creek begins to the west of Panther Hill in Thornhurst Township. It flows north for several tenths of a mile, passing through Clifton Township for a few hundred feet and entering Spring Brook Township. The creek then turns north-northeast for a few tenths of a mile, entering a valley. At this point, it turns north-northwest for several tenths of a mile and receives Painter Creek, its only named tributary, from the left. It then flows in a northwesterly direction for several tenths of a mile to its confluence with Spring Brook.

Tributaries
Panther Creek has one named tributary, which is known as Painter Creek.

Hydrology
The concentration of alkalinity in Panther Creek is 4 milligrams per liter.

Geography and geology

The surficial geology along the lower reaches of Panther Creek consists of alluvium and alluvial terrace. Bedrock containing conglomeratic sandstone, sandstone, and shale is present slightly further from the creek, as is a glacial or resedimented till known as Wisconsinan Till. Further upstream, the surficial geology consists of bedrock consisting of conglomerate, shale, and sandstone. Wisconsinan Till is also present in some areas.

Watershed
The watershed is in the southwestern part of the Lackawanna River watershed. It is mostly in Spring Brook Township and Thornhurst Township. However, a small corner is in Clifton Township and an even smaller area is in Bear Creek Township, in Luzerne County. The mouth of the creek is in the United States Geological Survey quadrangle of Moscow. However, its source is in the quadrangle of Avoca.

A total of 97 percent of the length of Panther Creek is on public land that is open to access. The remaining 3 percent is on private land that is closed to access. The Theta Land Corp. owned land along the creek, but opened it to be public in 2002 by leasing it to the Pennsylvania Fish and Boat Commission for $1 per year.

History and recreation
Panther Creek was entered into the Geographic Names Information System on August 2, 1979. Its identifier in the Geographic Names Information System is 1183249.

The first sawmill in Spring Brook Township was constructed near the confluence of Panther Creek with Spring Brook, on the latter stream. In the early 2000s, the Lackawanna River Watershed Conservation Plan recommended that Spring Brook Township include protection of Panther Creek in their comprehensive plans, as well as their ordinances for land use, zoning, and subdivision.

Catch and release fishing is permitted on the entire length of Panther Creek.

Biology
Wild trout naturally reproduce in Panther Creek from its headwaters downstream to its mouth. They also do so in the tributary Painter Creek. The entire length of Panther Creek is considered by the Pennsylvania Fish and Boat Commission to be Class A Wild Trout Waters for brook trout.

See also
Plank Bridge Creek, next tributary of Spring Brook going upstream
List of rivers of Pennsylvania
List of tributaries of the Lackawanna River

References

Rivers of Lackawanna County, Pennsylvania
Tributaries of Spring Brook (Lackawanna River)
Rivers of Pennsylvania